Charles Kane is a business executive who currently serves as president and chief operations officer of the One Laptop Per Child Association. Kane was promoted to president of OLPC on May 2, 2008. Previously, Kane was the chief financial officer of RSA Security, a security firm acquired by EMC. He also previously served as president and chief executive officer of Corechange, a software firm acquired by Open Text. Since 2006 he has been an adjunct professor at MIT Sloan Graduate School of Management. He is married to Amanda Kempa-Kane, a historian at the Kennedy School of Government, Harvard University, and has two children.

See also 
 One Laptop per Child

References

External links 
 Biography on OLPC website

One Laptop per Child
Year of birth missing (living people)
Living people
American chief financial officers
American chief operating officers